The 1997 United States Open Championship was the 97th U.S. Open, held June 12–15 at the Blue Course of Congressional Country Club in Bethesda, Maryland, a suburb northwest of Washington, D.C. Ernie Els won his second U.S. Open, the second of his four major championships, one stroke ahead of runner-up Colin Montgomerie.

Course layout

Past champions in the field

Made the cut

Missed the cut

Round summaries

First round
Thursday, June 12, 1997

Second round
Friday, June 13, 1997
Saturday, June 14, 1997

Amateurs: Kribel (+8), Wollmann (+9), Noe (+11), Semelsberger (+14), Kearney (+17).

Third round
Saturday, June 14, 1997
Sunday, June 15, 1997

Final round
Sunday, June 15, 1997

Amateurs: none made the cut

Scorecard
Final round

Cumulative tournament scores, relative to par

Source:

References

External links
 Coverage from USA Today

U.S. Open (golf)
Golf in Maryland
Bethesda, Maryland
U.S. Open
U.S. Open (golf)
U.S. Open (golf)
U.S. Open (golf)